Count Alexander Petrovich Tormasov (22 August 1752 – 25 November 1819) was a Russian cavalry general prominent during the Napoleonic Wars.

Early life
Alexander Tormasov was born on 22 August 1752 into an old Russian noble family. At the age of ten, he entered service as a Page of Honour, then, aged 20 in 1772 he began military service as a lieutenant of the Vyatka infantry regiment. Within a few weeks he joined the staff of Yakov Bruce as aide-de-camp. Three years later Tormasov formed and headed the Finland Chasseur regiment with the rank of lieutenant colonel. In 1782 Prince Potemkin charged to him an operation in the Crimea. Following that Tormasov commanded the Dolmatsky Hussars, on the base of which he formed and led the Aleksandrian light cavalry regiment with the rank of colonel.

Time as general
In 1788–1791 he took part in the Russo-Turkish War, serving at the Siege of Ochakov and the Danube river raids, and was promoted to major general on 21 March 1791. He commanded the left flank cavalry at the storm of Machin, for which he received the Order of St. George 3rd Class. In 1792 and 1794 he successfully acted against the Polish–Lithuanian Commonwealth during the Polish–Russian War of 1792 and Kościuszko Uprising, commanding a column under Suvorov in the assault on Prague.

Like many other generals of this time, he was dismissed by Emperor Paul I on 11 July 1799 and was imprisoned in the Dünamünde fortress for several months. On 16 November 1800 he was restored in the army. On 15 September 1801, on the day of the coronation of the new Emperor Alexander I he was promoted to Full General of cavalry. Later he took up an administrative post until 1803.

Time as governor and commander
From 1803 Tormasov served as governor of Kiev, Minsk, and from 1807 Riga. From 1809 to 1811, he served as a Viceroy of Georgia and as the commander-in-chief in the Caucasus. After the French invasion of Russia began, Tormasov became the Chief Commander of the 40,000-man Third Reserve Army of Observation on 27 March 1812. Advancing North against Jean Reynier in mid July, he overwhelmed Klengel's Saxon brigade at Kobryn 27th, marking the first Russian victory in the campaign. Tormasov received the Order of St. George 2nd Class for this. Defeated in turn by Reynier and Schwarzenberg at Gorodetschna (Podobna, Prujany) 12 August, he then withdrew to Ratno to join with the corps of Pavel Chichagov, meeting him on the Styr River 18 September. The combined command then acted under the orders of Mikhail Kutuzov, and fought at Brest-Litovsk 9 October. Ordered to envelop the Grande Armée at Liady, he was however recalled to the main army by Kutusov after being repulsed at the 2nd Battle of Krasnoe 15 November. Appointed by Kutuzov with internal management of all troops in December, he was then made overall commander of the Russian main Army after Kutuzov's death.

In 1813 he commanded the Russian army at the Battle of Lützen, but then resigned due to failing health.

Late life and career
After leaving military service he became a member of the State Council. On 30 August 1814 he succeeded Count Fyodor Rostopchin as Governor-general of the Moscow Governorate. Two years later he received a comital title for his efforts in rebuilding the city.

After his death in Moscow on November 25, 1819, he was buried in the Donskoy Monastery. Tormasov's only son died in 1839 and thus this family became extinct.

References

Sources

External links 
 
 Dictionary of Russian Generals

Governors-General of Kiev
1752 births
1819 deaths
Imperial Russian Army generals
Governors-General of Moscow
Members of the State Council (Russian Empire)
Caucasus Viceroyalty (1801–1917)
1800s in Georgia (country)
Russian commanders of the Napoleonic Wars
Counts of the Russian Empire
Russian people of the Kościuszko Uprising
Russian people of the Napoleonic Wars
People of the Russo-Persian Wars
Russian people of the Polish–Russian War of 1792
Recipients of the Order of St. George of the Second Degree
Recipients of the Order of St. George of the Third Degree
Recipients of the Order of the White Eagle (Poland)